Lake Creek is a stream in St. Charles and Warren County in the U.S. state of Missouri. It is a tributary of Charrette Creek.

Lake Creek was named for pools of water near its course when the stream is at flood stage.

See also
List of rivers of Missouri

References

Rivers of St. Charles County, Missouri
Rivers of Warren County, Missouri
Rivers of Missouri